"What's Your Sign" is a song by British pop and soul singer Des'ree. Written by the singer with the track's producer Ashley Ingram, "What's Your Sign?" was released as the fourth single from Des'ree's third studio album, Supernatural (1998). It was released on 26 October 1998 and reached number one in Spain as well as the top 40 in Austria and France.

Background
The song is about people's obsession with astrology and how compatible people are in love based on their astrological sign. It was released as the follow-up to Des'ree's European hit "Life".

Track listings

UK CD1
 "What's Your Sign?" (radio edit) – 3:56
 "What's Your Sign?" (Saturn Return mix) – 7:56
 "You Gotta Be" – 4:06

UK CD2
 "What's Your Sign?" (radio edit) – 3:56
 "What's Your Sign?" (Refugee Camp remix) – 4:13
 "What's Your Sign?" (Refugee Camp instrumental) – 4:10

Uk cassette single and European CD single
 "What's Your Sign?" (radio edit) – 3:56
 "You Gotta Be" – 4:06

Australian CD single
 "What's Your Sign?" (radio edit) – 3:56
 "What's Your Sign?" (Saturn Return mix) – 7:56
 "What's Your Sign?" (Refugee Camp remix) – 4:13
 "What's Your Sign?" (Refugee Camp instrumental) – 4:10
 "You Gotta Be" – 3:59

Japanese CD single
 "What's Your Sign?" (radio edit)
 "What's Your Sign?" (Saturn Return mix)
 "What's Your Sign?" (Aquarius mix)
 "You Gotta Be" (live)

Charts

References

1998 singles
1998 songs
Des'ree songs
Number-one singles in Spain
S2 Records singles
Songs written by Ashley Ingram